Jakkapong Sanmahung (born 6 April 2002) is a Thai footballer currently playing as a centre-back for Chonburi, on loan to Uthai Thani.

Club career
Sanmahung made national headlines in 2018 when he became the youngest player to score for Chonburi, doing so for the club's 'B' team in the Thai League 4. For the 2020 season, he was loaned to Thai League 3 side Banbueng, alongside teammate Warakorn Thongbai.

In 2021, he stepped up to the Thai League 2, signing on loan for Khon Kaen United, again making the move with Thongbai.

On his return to Chonburi, he established himself in the first team in the 2021–22 season.

International career
Sanmahung has represented Thailand at under-15 and under-16 level. While representing Thailand U16, Jakkapong scored against Northern Mariana Islands U16 in the 2018 AFC U-16 Championship qualification. Jakkapong also scored against Brunei U19 in the 2020 AFC U-19 Championship qualification.

Personal life
Jakkapong  is the brother of fellow professional footballer Nitipong Sanmahung.

Career statistics

Club

Notes

References

2002 births
Living people
Jakkapong Sanmahung
Jakkapong Sanmahung
Jakkapong Sanmahung
Association football defenders
Jakkapong Sanmahung
Jakkapong Sanmahung
Jakkapong Sanmahung
Jakkapong Sanmahung
Jakkapong Sanmahung
Jakkapong Sanmahung
Jakkapong Sanmahung